The halfblack triplefin (Enneapterygius hemimelas), also known as the half-black triplefin, blackbelly triplefin, or the green-tail threefin, is a species of triplefin blenny in the genus Enneapterygius. It was originally described by R. Kner and F. Steindachner in 1867. It is a non-migratory tropical blenny known from coral reefs in the western Pacific Ocean, and has been described from the Ryukyu Islands to eastern Australia. It has been recorded swimming at a depth range of 0–30 metres (0-98.4 feet).

The halfblack triplefin is described as a "relatively large" member of the Enneapterygius hemimelas species group.

References

Halfblack triplefin
Fish described in 1867